Gotta Catch 'Em All is the English-language slogan for the Pokémon franchise. It may also refer to:

The alternate name for "Pokémon Theme", the first theme song of the English dubbed Pokémon anime series
"Gotta Catch 'Em All" (song), a 2001 song by 50.Grind